Abraham Sfej (early 18th century – 1784) was an 18th-century rabbinical author. He left his native city of Tunis and settled in Jerusalem, sojourning for a time in Constantinople. He died in Amsterdam while raising money there for the Jewish community of Jerusalem.

Publications
 Ene Abraham (Amsterdam, 1784), a commentary on the Yad ha-Ḥazakah of Maimonides.

References
 

18th-century Tunisian rabbis
Authors of Rabbinic works
Rabbis in Ottoman Palestine
People from Tunis